"What I Got" is a song from American band Sublime's self-titled third album (1996). It was the band's biggest radio hit, posthumously after singer Bradley Nowell's death in 1996 from a heroin overdose. It was the second single to be released by the band, following "Date Rape" (1991). The song's chorus is a lift from "Loving" by Half Pint. The song's melody is similar to the Beatles' "Lady Madonna".

"What I Got" reached the number-one spot on the US Billboard Modern Rock Tracks chart and was also a radio hit, peaking at number 29 on the Billboard Hot 100 Airplay chart. In New Zealand, "What I Got" peaked at number 34 on the RIANZ Singles Chart; What I Got: The Seven Song EP charted higher, reaching number 33 on the same chart. Elsewhere, the single reached number two on the Canadian RPM Alternative 30 chart and number 19 in Iceland. It is ranked on Rolling Stone magazine's "100 Greatest Guitar Songs of All Time" at number 83.

Music video
The video for "What I Got", shot after Nowell's death, mainly contains a collage of archive videos and photos of him, as a tribute to the singer. The video includes images of Long Beach, California, where the band met their success, as well as live footage from a Sublime show at The Capitol Ballroom in Washington, DC.

Track listings

Australian and European CD single
 "What I Got" – 2:51
 "Saw Red" – 1:57
 "Jailhouse" (live) – 4:40
 "What I Got" (demo version) – 2:39

UK CD single
 "What I Got" (Super No Mofo edit) – 2:51
 "Rivers of Babylon" – 2:29
 "All You Need" – 2:45
 "What I Got" (reprise) – 3:02

UK 7-inch single
A. "What I Got" (Super No Mofo edit) – 2:51
B. "Rivers of Babylon" – 2:29

What I Got: The Seven Song EP
 "What I Got" (Kahne radio edit) – 2:48
 "40 oz. to Freedom" – 3:18
 "D.J.s" – 3:05
 "All You Need" – 2:45
 "Same in the End" – 2:38
 "Work That We Do" – 2:37
 "Doin' Time" (Marshall Arts Remix featuring the Pharcyde) – 4:12

Charts

Weekly charts

Year-end charts

Release history

References

1996 singles
1996 songs
Bret Michaels songs
MCA Records singles
Song recordings produced by David Kahne
Songs written by Bradley Nowell
Sublime (band) songs